Jack Sock was the defending champion, but lost in the second round to Reilly Opelka.

Frances Tiafoe won his first ATP World Tour title, defeating Peter Gojowczyk in the final, 6–1, 6–4.

Seeds

Draw

Finals

Top half

Bottom half

Qualifying

Seeds

Qualifiers

Lucky losers

Qualifying draw

First qualifier

Second qualifier

Third qualifier

Fourth qualifier

External links
 Main draw
 Qualifying draw

Delray Beach Open - Singles
2018 Singles